St. Peter and St. Paul's Church (Samogitian: Šv. apaštuolū Petra ė Pauliaus bažninčė) is a Roman Catholic church in Varniai, Lithuania. Until 1864 the church was the cathedral of Samogitian diocese and the seat of Bishops of Samogitia.

History

The first cathedral in Varniai was built in 15th century under the patronage of the Grand Duke of Lithuania Vytautas. The church was built in 1691, ten years since it was started to build. Its construction was funded by Samogitian Bishop Kazimierz Pac after the earlier cathedral was destroyed by fire.

A fire in 1817 made great losses to the church but it was restored by Samogitian Bishop Józef Arnulf Giedroyć.

Until 1864 the church had the title of cathedral and served as the seat of Bishops of Samogitia. However, after the January Uprising, the seat of Diocese was moved to Kaunas and Varniai cathedral became an ordinary church.

It is believed that around 10 Samogitian bishops are buried in the Cathedral.

Today the church belongs to Roman Catholic Diocese of Telšiai and is the center of Varniai parish.

Architecture

The building is of mature Lithuanian baroque architecture: the three-nave basilica with a transept, two chapels, two in front protruding square plan towers with a belfry. This baroque church architecture of the mature style of classicism has become rigid and laconic. Varniai cathedrals interior is rich in artistic monuments: 12 altars, nineteenth century organ. It has 17th-18th centuries' portraits and epitaph plaques of the Samogitian bishops.

The main altar was created in 1694 by Maumo Poloni from Königsberg.

Sources
Official page of Varniai parish
Information about the church on the official page of Telšiai Diocese

References

Roman Catholic churches in Telšiai County
Roman Catholic cathedrals in Lithuania
Roman Catholic churches completed in 1691
Tourist attractions in Telšiai County
Objects listed in Lithuanian Registry of Cultural Property
17th-century Roman Catholic church buildings in Lithuania